Taereung station is a transfer station on Line 6 and Line 7 in Seoul, South Korea.  The station is located near the entrance of Taereung Shrine, the burial site of Queen Munjeong. The station is also located near Taereung International Rifle Range, which is located in Pureundongsan Amusement Park.

Station layout

Line 6

Line 7

Gallery

References

Seoul Metropolitan Subway stations
Metro stations in Nowon District
Railway stations opened in 1996